Ray Odums (born October 30, 1951) is a football player who played in the CFL and USFL.  He played defensive back (DB).  From 1975 to 1984 Odums was DB for the Winnipeg Blue Bombers, the Saskatchewan Roughriders, and the Calgary Stampeders. He was a CFL All-Star in 1980, 1981 and 1982. Later he played with the Memphis Showboats in the USFL in 1985. Odums played college football at the University of Alabama.

Odums also was a standout guard on the Alabama Crimson Tide basketball team and played for coach CM Newton, who would start five black players in a time of racial turbulence and progress.  Center Leon Douglas said, "We knew Coach Newton (signed us) because he wanted to win.  He wasn't trying to be a trailblazer. You have to respect a man for putting five black starters on the court when others said it was a no-no."  On December 28, 1973, in a 65-55 win at Louisville Cardinals men's basketball, Newton started Douglas, Charles "Boonie" Russell, Charles Cleveland, T.R. Dunn and Odums for the first all-black starting line-up in SEC history, and a team that would win the SEC season title.

References

http://grfx.cstv.com/photos/schools/alab/sports/m-baskbl/auto_pdf/2011-12/misc_non_event/1112_MBKB_Guide.pdf

1952 births
Living people
Alabama Crimson Tide football players
Winnipeg Blue Bombers players
Saskatchewan Roughriders players
Calgary Stampeders players
American players of Canadian football
Canadian football defensive backs
Memphis Showboats players
American football defensive backs